Minardi was an automobile racing team and constructor.

People
Minardi is a surname of Italian origin. Notable people with the surname include:

Éric Minardi (born 1956), French politician
Giancarlo Minardi (born 1947), founder of Minardi
Giuseppe Minardi (born 1928), former Italian racing cyclist
John Minardi (born 1979), former American football player
Marc Minardi, (born 1986), Canadian actor
Natalie Minardi Slater, American television soap opera writer
Tommaso Minardi (1787–1871), Italian painter and author on art theory
Viviano Minardi (born 1998), Italian football player

Other
Minardi Piquet Sports, auto racing team currently known as Rapax Team
Minardi Team USA, auto racing team also known as HVM Racing
 Minardi (horse)

Italian-language surnames